Crnogorski elektroprenosni sistem AD (MNSE: PREN) (CGES; former name Prenos AD; meaning: Montenegrin Electrical Transmission System) is an electric power transmission system operator located in Podgorica, Montenegro. It is a member of European Network of Transmission System Operators for Electricity. AD stands for Akcionersko Drustvo, or Joint Stock Company. 

In 2009, the company broke away from EPCG and partly privatized, with 43.7% stake in the company acquired by the Italian utility company A2A. 22% stake is owned by Italian electricity transmission company Terna.

CGES and Terna are planning to build a  1,000 MW submarine cable between Tivat and Pescara.  The cable to be operational by 2015.

The European Bank for Reconstruction and Development is preparing a €65 million syndicated loan for the company. The loan would be used for the construction of a new substation at Lastva, and a new line from Lastva to Pljevlja to be connected to the  Italy–Montenegro interconnector.

See also

Energy in Montenegro

References

External links
 

Electric power transmission system operators in Montenegro